"These Dreams" is a song by American rock band Heart from their 1985 self-titled eighth studio album Heart. It was released on January 18, 1986, as the album's third single, becoming the band's first song to top the Billboard Hot 100. The single's B-side track, "Shell Shock" (on some releases), was also the B-side of Heart's previous single "Never".

Background
In 1985, singer-songwriter Martin Page, who co-wrote other successful songs including "We Built This City" and "King of Wishful Thinking", and Bernie Taupin, longtime collaborator of Elton John, wrote a song which would later be titled "These Dreams". The song was offered to Stevie Nicks, who expressed no interest in recording it. Heart had just recently signed with Capitol Records, and while the band had previously recorded their own material, they were impressed by "These Dreams" and agreed to use the song on their upcoming album.

The track is a power ballad with a more polished sound in comparison to Heart's previous work and was the band's first single on which Nancy Wilson performed lead vocals instead of Ann Wilson. According to The Billboard Book of Number One Hits by Fred Bronson, when it came time for Wilson to record her vocals, she was suffering from a cold and sounded somewhat raspy and gravelly. After the song reached commercial success, producers reportedly wanted Wilson to recreate the vocal style on future recordings, asking her: "Can't you just get sick again?"

Composition
The liner notes of Heart state that the track was dedicated to Wilson's good friend Sharon Hess, who died from leukemia shortly before it was released. The lyrics of the track describe the fantasy world a woman enters, every time she sleeps, when faced with a difficult situation in life.

The anthemic chorus of the song is performed in the key of B major with a tempo of approximately 79 beats per minute. The verses are in G# minor, modulating into the relative major for the chorus.

Reception
Cash Box called it "a tender, forlorn song which features a rare lead vocal appearance by Nancy [Wilson]."

Commercial performance
The track was released as the third single from Heart. Following two consecutive US Top 10 singles, it elevated the band's success, becoming Heart's first single to reach number one on the Billboard Hot 100 on March 22, 1986. It also became Heart's first and only number-one song on the US Adult Contemporary chart In the United Kingdom, the single initially peaked at number 62 on the UK Singles Chart, but, following the success of the band's 1987 single "Alone" in the country, the song was re-released in 1988 as a double A-side with "Never", and reached a new peak of number 8.

Music video
A music video was made for the song, recorded via Capitol Records and directed by Jeff Stein. The clip for the track, which used the single version instead of the album version, received heavy airplay from MTV and was the third of four US Top 10 singles from Heart. This version (slightly shorter) does not have the second strophe of the original verses. 

In the video, Nancy Wilson sings as she over looks a pool of water and plays guitar in other sequences. Ann Wilson sings with her from shadow and the other band members have brief appearances performing the song. Wilson plays a Dean guitar as well as a petite sail-shaped electric guitar, created by luthier David Petschulat.

Versions and formats
A remix of the track, at a length of 5 minutes and 25 seconds, appears on a UK limited laser-etched, one-sided 12" single edition upon which a scratch vocal is used. Nancy had not gotten sick yet at this point but had come down with a cold when the time came to lay down the chart-topping production vocal. The UK CD single edition featured the B-side track "Heart of Darkness", a track which is only available in CD format on that edition. Additionally, in the UK, a limited 7" picture disc edition was released and in 1987, after the success of "Alone", "These Dreams" was re-released as a double A side with "Never".

Charts

Weekly charts

Year-end charts

References

1980s ballads
1985 songs
1986 singles
American soft rock songs
Billboard Hot 100 number-one singles
Capitol Records singles
Cashbox number-one singles
Heart (band) songs
Rock ballads
Song recordings produced by Ron Nevison
Songs about dreams
Songs with lyrics by Bernie Taupin
Songs written by Martin Page